Azad Veys may refer to:
 Azad Veys-e Olya
 Azad Veys-e Sofla